Nervosa is a thrash/death metal band originally from São Paulo, Brazil. The band is signed to Napalm Records and has released four studio albums and one EP. They have had numerous lineup changes since its formation in 2010, leaving guitarist Prika Amaral as the only constant member.

History

Foundation and Victim of Yourself (2010–2015)
The band was founded in 2010 by guitarist Prika Amaral and drummer Fernanda Terra, months later Karen Ramos joined the band as a second guitarist. A year and a half later, bassist Fernanda Lira joined while Karen Ramos left the band. Ramos lived far outside of São Paulo and was therefore rarely able to take part in band rehearsals. The remaining musicians, who had previously played in pure female bands, then decided to continue as a trio.

In 2012 the band released the demo Time of Death and produced for the song Masked Betrayer a music video. Drummer Fernanda Terra left the band a short time later and was replaced by Pitchu Ferraz. 
In May 2012 the band was signed by the Austrian record label Napalm Records. The band recorded their debut album in 2013, Victim of Yourself, produced by Heros Trench and Marcello Pompeu by Brazilian thrash metal band Korzus.

Agony and Downfall of Mankind (2016–2019)
The recordings for the second studio album started in January 2016 in the USA and it was produced by Brendan Duffey.

In February 2018, the band recorded their third studio album Downfall of Mankind with  new drummer Luana Dametto and producer Martin Furia: the album was released on June 1, 2018. João Gordo from the band Ratos de Porão, Rodrigo Oliveira from the band Korzus and Michael Gilbert from the band Flotsam and Jetsam appear as guest musicians.

First rebuild, Perpetual Chaos cycle (2020–2022)
In April 2020, bassist and vocalist Fernanda Lira and drummer Luana Dametto left Nervosa and found their own project Crypta; Amaral described the split as amicable and solely based on musical differences. They were replaced by vocalist Diva Satanica (Bloodhunter), bassist Mia Wallace (Abbath) and drummer Eleni Nota. With this new lineup, Nervosa as a four-piece recorded their fourth studio album Perpetual Chaos, which was released on January 22, 2021. Special guests have been Schmier from Destruction, Eric A.K. of Flotsam and Jetsam fame and Guiherme Miranda. Prika spoke about the international line-up which comprises now members from Brazil, Italy, Spain and Greece, as a logistic choice, saying that traveling questions and touring will work much better. Nervosa began touring worldwide in support of Perpetual Chaos a year after its release. As of April 2022, according to Diva Satánica, Nervosa has begun writing new material for their fifth studio album.

Second band revamp and a new beginning (2023–present)

In late August 2022, it was announced drummer Eleni Nota had departed the band due to health issues and was being replaced by Nanu Villalba. Less than four months later, it was announced Villalba had departed the band due to a "lack of common agreement". It was also announced the band parted ways with vocalist Diva Satánica in September 2022. Mia Wallace, due to personal reasons, also resigns from intensive touring but remains in good terms with the band and will perform occasionally on selected gigs. Amaral states that Nervosa "could basically have two bassists".
The major changes force Prika Amaral to rebuild the lineup once again. In January 2023, Helena Kotina (who already filled in on bass for Mia Wallace in 2022) joins the band as a second guitarist. Actually she joined the band back in March 2021, a few months after the band released Perpetual Chaos, and his involved in the songwriting of new compositions.  In early 2023, via the band's social media accounts, Michaela Naydenova is presented as the new drummer; she already collaborated on the recording and composing of the next album. Hel Pyre is announced as new live bassist, alternating onstage with Mia Wallace.

Members

Band members
 Prika Amaral – guitars, backing vocals (2010–present)
 Helena Kotina – guitars (2021–present)
 Mia Wallace - bass (2020–present)
 Michaela Naydenova – drums (2023–present)

Live members

 Hel Pyre - bass (2023-present)

Former members
 Fernanda Terra – drums (2010–2012)
 Karen Ramos – guitars (2010–2011)
 Fernanda Lira – bass, lead vocals (2011–2020)
 Jully Lee – drums (2012)
 Pitchu Ferraz – drums (2013-2016)
 Luana Dametto  – drums (2016–2020)
 Eleni Nota – drums (2020–2022)
 Nanu Villalba – drums (2022)
 Diva Satánica – lead vocals (2020–2022)

Former live members 
 Amílcar Christófaro – drums (2012, 2014)
 Samantha Landa – drums (2016)
 Aira Deathstorm – drums (2016)
 Simone van Straten – guitars (2017)
 Helena Kotina – bass (2022)

Timeline

Discography
 Time of Death  (EP) (2012)
 Victim of Yourself (2014)
 Agony  (2016)
 Downfall of Mankind (2018)
 Perpetual Chaos (2021)

References

External links
 Official Website
 

2010 establishments in Brazil
All-female bands
Brazilian thrash metal musical groups
Musical quartets